Amlan, officially the Municipality of Amlan, is a 4th class municipality in the province of Negros Oriental, Philippines. According to the 2020 census, it has a population of 25,513 people.

Amlan was formerly known as Ayuquitan.

History
Nineteenth-century chronicler Licinio Ruiz mentions Alman, a settlement said to have been named after a superior kind of guava. The town was made a parish independent of Tanjay in 1848, was renamed Ayuquitan in 1912, became Amlan after WW II.

Its Church of St. Andrew the Apostle, completed in 1853 (and said to have taken 50 years to build), is the centerpiece of the town's tourism while providing photo opportunists with a colonial period backdrop. The ruins of watch towers against the Moro depredations of old can still be seen in Buswang and near the mouth of the Amlan River; and two others near the school building of Ayuquitan and barrio Calo.

Geography

Barangays
Amlan is politically subdivided into 8 barangays:

 Bio-os
 Jantianon
 Jugno
 Mag-abo
 Poblacion
 Silab
 Tambojangin
 Tandayag

Climate

Demographics

Economy

Tourism
Amlan is home to many natural and man-made attractions:

Dreamland Nature and Adventure Park (DNAP)A ten-minute ride away from the highway, DNAP is divided into two parks: the Animal Kingdom that showcases a collection of wildlife and other endangered species and the Adventure Park for those wanting some adrenaline rush. Activities in the Adventure Park include aerial walk, river tubing, and soon to be opened avatar zip line, tandem zip line and giant tandem swing.

Amlan Boulevard The boulevard will soon host an array of aquatic adventure sports and is developed to become the jump off point to the town's two marine sanctuaries.

Tandayag Marine SanctuaryTouted as one of Tanon Strait's top sanctuaries, the sanctuary has not seen yet an overcrowding of scuba divers.  The fisherfolk managing the area is keen in sustaining the carrying capacity of the marine reserve.

Bio-os Takot-Diot SanctuaryThe second center piece to Amlan's sustained efforts to marine conservation, Takot Diot is just a short hop from the coastline in Bio-os.

Amlan Pasalan FallsThe most majestic of the many falls found in Amlan, Pasalan is located in Silab Highlands.  It can be accessed via all forms of vehicle but for the moment, anyone wanting to see the falls, must first secure approval from the local government for safety reasons.

Kang-Untol FallsA prelude to its much bigger sister, Kang-Untol has a mini-lagoon for those wanting to soak in.

Asupri sa MaitiA sulfur lagoon up in Jantianon Highlands, Asupri has seen an increase of tourists after photos and videos the attraction were posted in social media.

Naparil and Cantalina Falls The most accessible falls in Amlan, Naparil is a short 20-minute walk from the main road in Silab.

Lantawan AmlanThe town's highest peak at 1,101 meters above sea level.

Kang Atid A good place to start river trekking and explore the environs along the banks of the Amlan River.

Jantianon Tri-FallsThe location may be difficult to access ,but the three falls, namely, Paphaan, Divine and Paphaun, are sure to delight those weary souls wanting to get away from life's hustle and bustle.

Products
 Cogon-based paper products courtesy of Marina - from fans, scrapbook, picture frames. The store is located at the Amlan Municipal Market.
 Jiovencio's arts and crafts - bamboo and coco shells fashioned into decorative items.
 Tonya's Budlit - "budbud with tsokolit", hence, "budlit" is a know pasalubong.

Education
The public elementary and secondary schools of Amlan are supervised by the Amlan District of DepEd Division of Negros Oriental.

Public High Schools

Public Elementary Schools
 Amlan Central Elementary School
 Aurelio Ibero Memorial Elementary School  (Jugno Elementary School)
 Bio-os Elementary School
 Cañete Elementary School
 Cantalina Elementary School
 Jantianon Elementary School
 Martin Benjamin Memorial Elementary School  (Tambojangin Elementary School )
 Panusuan Elementary School
 Silab Elementary School
 Tandayag Elementary School

References

External links

 [ Philippine Standard Geographic Code]
Philippine Census Information
Local Governance Performance Management System

Municipalities of Negros Oriental